Pine State Biscuits is a chain of breakfast restaurants based in Portland, Oregon. Established in 2006, there are four locations in Portland plus one in Reno, Nevada, as of 2018. Food & Wine included Pine State Biscuits in a 2017 list of the best biscuits in the United States.

Locations
Portland has restaurants along Division, Alberta, and Northwest 23rd.

The Rose Quarter location opened in 2014.

See also
 List of Diners, Drive-Ins and Dives episodes

References

External links

 

2006 establishments in Oregon
American companies established in 2006
Companies based in Portland, Oregon
Restaurants established in 2006
Restaurants in Nevada
Restaurants in Portland, Oregon